Olympiacos F.C. has a long presence in UEFA competitions. They made their debut on 13 September 1959, in a game against Milan at the Karaiskakis Stadium for the 1959–60 European Cup, being the first Greek team to compete in a European competition. Olympiacos was also the first Greek club to advance to the next round of any European competition, eliminating Zagłębie Sosnowiec for the 1963–64 European Cup Winners' Cup. Their best European campaigns are their presence in the 1998–99 Champions League quarter-finals, where they lost a semi-final spot in the last minutes by Juventus, and in the 1992–93 European Cup Winners' Cup quarter-finals, losing to Atlético Madrid.

Olympiacos is the highest ranked Greek team in the UEFA rankings, occupying the 40th place in Europe at the end of the 2021–22 season. They are also the Greek team with the most wins in all European competitions, leading also the table with the most home and away wins. They celebrated their 200th match on 23 February 2010, against Bordeaux in the 2009–10 UEFA Champions League first knockout round. Olympiacos also holds the all-time record attendance for a Greek club of 75,263 in a 1982–83 European Cup match against Hamburger SV at the Athens Olympic Stadium. Olympiacos has also won the Balkans Cup in 1963, at a time when the competition was considered the second most important in the region after the European Cup, becoming the first ever Greek club to win an international competition.

Olympiacos, throughout its European history, has eliminated (in either knockout matches or group stages) clubs like Milan, Arsenal, Ajax, Benfica, Porto, Borussia Dortmund, Lazio, Celtic, Werder Bremen, Anderlecht, Monaco, Deportivo La Coruña, Hertha BSC, Cagliari, PSV Eindhoven and Standard Liège among others. They have spent most of their European history in the UEFA Champions League, where they are widely known for being a very strong home side, having run some long-standing sequences, such as the 15 straight UEFA Champions League unbeaten home matches since their debut in the tournament under its new format, when Manchester United stopped their record in their fifth consecutive participation, and their 15 wins in 19 UEFA Champions League home matches between 2009–10 and 2014–15. They have a vast record of home wins over traditional European powerhouses and UEFA Champions League winners, such as Real Madrid, Milan, Liverpool, Manchester United, Ajax, Juventus, Borussia Dortmund, Benfica, Porto, Marseille, PSV Eindhoven, Celtic and Red Star Belgrade, among many other major European clubs.

History

First Greek club to play in the European competitions: Olympiacos–Milan (1959)
Olympiacos has a long presence in UEFA competitions, debuting on 13 September 1959 against Milan for the 1959–60 European Cup, being the first Greek club to participate in the European competitions. The first leg was held at the Karaiskakis Stadium in Piraeus and Olympiacos took the lead with a goal by Kostas Papazoglou (1–0), which was the first goal ever scored by a Greek club (and by a Greek player as well) in the European competitions. Milan's prolific goalscorer José Altafini equalised the match with a header in the 33rd minute, after a cross by Giancarlo Danova. Ilias Yfantis scored an outstanding goal and gave Olympiacos the lead again in the 45th minute of the game, when he controlled the ball between Cesare Maldini and Vincenzo Occhetta and unleashed a powerful volley, burying the ball into the back of the net (2–1). Altafini scored his second goal once again with a header (72nd minute), after a free-kick by Nils Liedholm. The match ended 2–2, with Olympiacos putting in a great performance against the Italian champions, despite the fact that they had no foreign players in their roster, while Milan had four world-class foreign players, such as Altafini, Liedholm, Juan Alberto Schiaffino and Ernesto Grillo. In the second leg Milan won 3–1 (Giancarlo Danova 12', 26', 85'–Psychos 68') and qualified for the next round, despite Olympiacos strong performance especially in the second half.

Balkans Cup Winners (1963) 
In 1963, Olympiacos became the first ever Greek club to win a non-domestic competition, winning the Balkans Cup, which marked the first international success by any Greek football club. The Balkans Cup was a very popular international competition in the 1960s (the 1967 final attracted 42,000 spectators), being the second most important international club competition for clubs from the Balkans (after the European Champions' Cup). Olympiacos topped his group after some notable wins, beating Galatasaray 1–0 at the Karaiskakis Stadium (Stelios Psychos 49'), as well as FK Sarajevo (3–2) and FC Brașov (1–0), bagging also two away draws against Galatasaray (1–1) in Mithatpaşa Stadium (Metin Oktay 78' – Aristeidis Papazoglou 6') and FK Sarajevo in Koševo Stadium (3–3). In the final, they faced Levski Sofia, winning the first match in Piraeus (1–0, Giorgos Sideris 37') and losing the second match in Vasil Levski Stadium with the same score. In the third decisive final in Istanbul (a neutral ground), Olympiacos beat Levski 1–0 in Mithatpaşa Stadium with a goal by Mimis Stefanakos in the 87th minute and won the Balkans Cup.

First Greek club to advance to the next round of any European competition (1963–64) 
In 1963, Olympiacos became the first Greek team to advance to the next round of any European competition, eliminating Zagłębie Sosnowiec from Poland for the 1963–64 European Cup Winners' Cup. They won the first match in Piraeus 2–1, lost the second leg in Poland 1–0 and beat Zagłębie 2–0 in the third decisive match. In the next phase, they faced Lyon and despite their 2–1 win in Georgios Karaiskakis Stadium they were eliminated by the strong French side.

Eliminating Riva's Cagliari and Dalglish's Celtic, Palotai denies quarter-finals spot (1972–75) 
In the 1972–75 Goulandris era, Olympiacos had a solid presence in European competitions, eliminating great clubs, and losing their qualification to the quarter-finals of the 1975 European Cup in a highly controversial game. They managed to eliminate Cagliari in the 1972–73 UEFA Cup, a major force in Italian football during the late 1960s and the early 1970s, (1970 Serie A Champions, 1972 Serie A title contenders), with world-class Italian international players like Gigi Riva, Angelo Domenghini, Enrico Albertosi, Pierluigi Cera, Sergio Gori and Fabrizio Poletti. Olympiacos managed to beat Cagliari twice, 2–1 in Piraeus and 1–0 in Cagliari, becoming the first ever Greek football club to win on Italian soil. In the next round they faced the competition's defending champions Tottenham Hotspur, who were undefeated for 16-straight games in all European competitions. Olympiacos did not manage to qualify against Spurs, but they managed to get a 1–0 win in Piraeus, which ended Tottenham's undefeated streak and marked the first ever victory of a Greek football club against an English side. Two years later, Olympiacos entered the 1974–75 European Cup and they were drawn to face Kenny Dalglish's Celtic, one of the strongest teams in European football at that time and semi-finalists of the previous season. The first leg was played in Celtic Park, where Celtic had never been defeated, running an undefeated streak of 36 straight home games in all European competitions (27 wins, 9 draws) from 1962 to 1974. Olympiacos took the lead through Milton Viera's strike in the 36th minute, with Celtic equalising late in the game. The away draw gave Olympiacos the advantage and they finished the job in Piraeus, after a spectacular 2–0 win against the Scottish Champions with Kritikopoulos and Stavropoulos finding the net. In the next round, they were drawn to play against Anderlecht for a place in the quarter-finals of the competition. Anderlecht won the first leg with 5–1 and Olympiacos' task seemed impossible. In the second leg in Greece, however, Olympiacos put on a dominant display and almost reached a winning score in a match that was marked by referee Károly Palotai's decisions. Olympiacos beat Anderlecht 3–0, while Palotai disallowed four Olympiacos goals and did not give at least three clear penalties committed by Anderlecht players, while Stavropoulos was shown a red card for no good reason. The match is widely known in Greece as the "Palotai massacre" with Olympiacos coming close to one of the biggest comebacks in European Cup history.

Eliminating AFC Ajax in European Cup (1983) 
In 1983 Olympiacos entered the 1983–84 European Cup and were drawn against the European powerhouse and Dutch champions AFC Ajax of world-class players like Marco van Basten, Ronald Koeman and Frank Rijkaard. The first leg was held in Amsterdam and ended with 0–0 draw, with Olympiacos holding firm and taking the advantage for the second leg. The second match in Athens was a thriller and a further goalless stalemate, before extra-time when Nikos Anastopoulos scored twice (95', 118') and send Olympiacos through, causing the 80,000 Olympiacos fans in the Olympic Stadium of Athens to burst into frenetic celebrations. In the Last 16 they faced Portuguese club Benfica, but despite their comfortable 1–0 in Athens, where Anastopoulos scored the goal and lost a crucial penalty as well, they were eliminated after a 3–0 defeat in Lisbon.

UEFA Cup Winners' Cup quarter-finalists (1992–93) 
In 1992 Olympiacos, coached by Oleh Blokhin, entered the 1992–93 European Cup Winners' Cup and after eliminating Chornomorets Odesa in the first round, they were drawn against Arsène Wenger's AS Monaco, a very strong side with players like Jürgen Klinsmann, Youri Djorkaeff, Lilian Thuram and Jean-Luc Ettori. Olympiacos eliminated Monaco and reached the quarter-finals after a hard-fought 1–0 away win in Stade Louis II with a goal by Giorgos Vaitsis in the 86th minute and a goalless draw in Karaiskakis Stadium in the second match. They weren't able to qualify for the semi-finals, as they were eliminated by Atlético Madrid, with 1–1 draw at home and 3–1 loss in Vicente Calderón.

Near-miss to UEFA Champions League semi-finals (1998–99) 
In the 1998–99 UEFA Champions League, one of the most talented ever Olympiacos sides came close to a semi-final appearance. Their campaign began in the second qualifying round, with Cypriot side Anorthosis not able to prevent them from participating in the group stage for a second time in a row. They were drawn in Group A along with Croatia Zagreb, Porto and Ajax, where they managed to win all three home games (Ajax 1–0, Porto 2–1 and Croatia Zagreb 2–0) and secure two away draws in Porto (2–2) and Zagreb (1–1), topping the group and getting the ticket for the quarter-finals. There, they were drawn to face Juventus, one of the favourites to win the trophy. In the first leg at the Stadio delle Alpi in Turin, Juventus took a 2–0 lead, but Olympiacos scored a crucial away goal in the 90th minute of the game with a penalty by Andreas Niniadis, a goal that caused the 10.000 Olympiacos fans who travelled to Italy to erupt into joyous ecstasy. The 2–1 scoreline meant that the Greek team only needed a 1–0 victory in Athens to proceed. In the second leg, Olympiacos had a vintage performance and totally dominated the match. They scored the goal that put them in the driving seat in the 12th minute of the game, when Siniša Gogić's powerful header found the back of the net after Grigoris Georgatos's superb cross. They also missed an outstanding chance to double the lead, when Giorgos Amanatidis' powerful header from short distance was saved by Michelangelo Rampulla. Olympiacos never allowed Juventus to create any dangerous situations throughout the game (they had zero chances to score) and kept the ticket to the semi-finals in his hands until the 85th minute, when the Italian side equalised the score after a crucial mistake by goalkeeper Dimitris Eleftheropoulos, who misjudged the flight of the ball in a seemingly harmless cross by Alessandro Birindelli. Eleftheropoulos had been the team's hero in all the previous games, but his mistake condemned Olympiacos, who pushed on in the last 5 minutes to find a goal, but to no avail.

Three UEFA Champions League Last 16 qualifications in six years (2008–14)

2007–08 UEFA Champions League campaign

In the 2007–08 UEFA Champions League, Olympiacos had an exceptional European campaign. Drawn in one of the toughest groups of the tournament along with Real Madrid, Werder Bremen and Lazio, Olympiacos finished second with eleven points, the same with group-winners Real Madrid, with the Spanish club taking the top place due to the better results in the two Olympiacos–Real Madrid matches. Following a draw 1–1 to Lazio at home, Olympiacos grabbed a spectacular 3–1 away win against Werder Bremen in Weserstadion, turning the game around from 0–1. In the third game, Olympiacos were finally defeated 4–2 to Real Madrid at the Santiago Bernabéu Stadium, after a heart-breaking match in which the Greek team was playing with 10 men from the 13th minute and was leading the score to the 68th with 2–1, turning it around from 0–1 and wasting a lot of chances to score more. Real Madrid scored their third goal in the 83rd, but Olympiacos came close to score many times during the last minutes of the match and leave Madrid with the draw, when Real secured the win with a last-minute goal, following an outstanding Olympiacos chance to equalise the score, with Iker Casillas saving Darko Kovačević's powerful header from close. Olympiacos opened the second round of the group stage with a draw 0–0 to Real Madrid at the Karaiskakis Stadium and kept alive the record of being undefeated by Real Madrid in Athens in four matches, while the Reds moved a step closer to qualifying for the Last 16 after coming from behind to defeat Lazio 2–1 in Stadio Olimpico. On 11 December, Olympiacos smashed Werder Bremen 3–0 at Karaiskakis Stadium, which ensured their place in the knockout stage of the tournament, where they faced Chelsea. At the first match in Piraeus, the Reds had a scoreless draw against the Blues, but were eliminated in the second leg at the Stamford Bridge after their 3–0 loss.

2009–10 UEFA Champions League campaign
In the 2009–10 UEFA Champions League, Olympiacos was drawn in a group against Arsenal, Standard Liège and AZ Alkmaar and qualified comfortably for the Last 16 with 10 points, winning all three games at home against Arsenal (1–0), Standard Liège (2–1) and Alkmaar (1–0), and drawing the match in Alkmaar (0–0). In the knockout stage, they faced Bordeaux and they lost 0–1 in the first round at home, in a closely contested match. In the second match, despite Bordeaux's early lead, Olympiacos leveled the match and missed some great chances to score a second goal, before eventually losing in the dying moments of the match (1–2).

2013–14 UEFA Champions League campaign
In the 2013–14 Champions League, they were drawn in Group C against Paris Saint-Germain, Benfica and Anderlecht. After a great performance in the group, Olympiacos finished second with ten points and qualified for the Last 16, eliminating Benfica (1–0 win in Piraeus, 1–1 draw in Lisbon) and Anderlecht (0–3 win in Brussels, 3–1 win in Piraeus). In the Last 16, they were drawn to play against Manchester United, who had never lost to a Greek club before. Olympiacos, after a top-class performance, won the first leg with a convincing 2–0, in a match where they dominated totally and missed chances to even extend the lead. Despite the two-goal advantage which put them within touching distance of a quarter-final place for the first time since 1999, Olympiacos lost 3–0 in the second leg in Old Trafford, having missed an outstanding double chance to equalize the score in the 40th minute. The Greek champions pushed on in the last ten minutes to find the crucial away goal, but they couldn't score.

UEFA competition record
Olympiacos' record in UEFA competitions.

As of 3 November 2022

UEFA club ranking

Five-year points
At the end of season 2020–21.

Ten-year points
At the end of season 2019–20.

Top scorers in UEFA competitions

Match table

Notes

 a.  In the second qualifying round.

Record by club

Notes

g.  A third game was played in neutral field in Vienna, Austria.

References

European Cups
Greek football clubs in international competitions